Patagonykus (meaning "Patagonian claw") is a genus of theropod dinosaur from the Upper Cretaceous of Argentina. This alvarezsauroid was discovered in exposures of the Portezuelo Formation (Turonian-Coniacian) of the Rio Neuquén Subgroup in the Neuquén Basin, Neuquen Province of Patagonia, Argentina. The holotype consists of an incomplete but well-preserved skeleton, lacking a skull, but including many vertebrae, the coracoids, a partial forelimb, pelvic girdle, and hindlimbs. Patagonykus has been classed with the Alvarezsauridae, a family which includes such taxa as the Mongolian Mononykus and the Argentinian Alvarezsaurus. In 2010 Gregory S. Paul estimated its length at 1 meter (3.3 ft) and its weight at 3.5 kg (7.7 lbs).

Classification
Agnolin et al. (2012) originally placed Patagonykus within Alvarezsauridae, within the clade Patagonykinae as sister taxon to Bonapartenykus. Makovicky, Apesteguía and Gianechini (2012) found it to be in a polytomy with Alnashetri, Bonapartenykus, and a clade containing more deeply nested taxa such as Linhenykus, Mononykus and Albinykus. However, Xu et al. (2018) positioned it as a basal Alvarezsauroidea, sister taxon to Patagonykus and Achillesaurus, which was also recovered by Fowler et al. (2020). Patagonykus has also been recovered as sister taxon to Bonapartenykus and Alvarezsauridae by Qin et al. (2019), and sister taxon to only Patagonykus outside of Alvarezsauridae by Averianov & Lopatin (2022a) and Averianov & Lopatin (2022b).

A phylogenetic analysis conducted by Fowler et al. (2020) is reproduced below.

The results of an earlier analysis by Agnolin et al. (2012) are reproduced below.

References

Further reading 
 F. E. Novas. 1994. Patagonykus puertai n. gen. et sp., and the phylogenetic relationships of the Alvarezsauridae (Theropoda, Maniraptora). VI Congreso Argentino de Paleontología y Bioestratigrafía, R. Cúneo (ed), Museo Paleontológico Egidio Feruglio, Trelew.
 Novas, F. E. 1997. Anatomy of Patagonykus puertai (Theropoda, Avialae, Alvarezsauridae), from the Late Cretaceous of Patagonia. Journal of Vertebrate Paleontology 17(1); 137–166.
 Novas, F. E. and Molnar, R. E. (eds.) 1996. Alvarezsauridae, Cretaceous basal birds from Patagonia and Mongolia. Proceedings of the Gondwanan Dinosaur Symposium, Brisbane. Memoirs of the Queensland Museum 39(3):iv + 489–731; 675–702.

Alvarezsaurs
Coniacian life
Turonian life
Late Cretaceous dinosaurs of South America
Cretaceous Argentina
Fossils of Argentina
Portezuelo Formation
Fossil taxa described in 1996
Taxa named by Fernando Novas